Cape Danger is the rocky point forming the northwest extremity of the ice-free Desolation Island situated in the entrance to Hero Bay, Livingston Island in the South Shetland Islands, Antarctica. The cape forms the west side of the entrance to Kozma Cove. The area was visited by early 19th century sealers operating from nearby Blythe Bay.

The feature was charted in 1935 by Discovery Investigations personnel and so named because of a group of sunken rocks extending from the cape.

Location

Maps
 L.L. Ivanov et al. Antarctica: Livingston Island and Greenwich Island, South Shetland Islands. Scale 1:100000 topographic map. Sofia: Antarctic Place-names Commission of Bulgaria, 2005.
 L.L. Ivanov. Antarctica: Livingston Island and Greenwich, Robert, Snow and Smith Islands. Scale 1:120000 topographic map.  Troyan: Manfred Wörner Foundation, 2009.  
 L.L. Ivanov. Antarctica: Livingston Island and Smith Island. Scale 1:100000 topographic map. Manfred Wörner Foundation, 2017.

References
 Cape Danger. SCAR Composite Gazetteer of Antarctica

Danger
Bulgaria and the Antarctic